Bujerash (also Romanized as Būjerāsh) is a village in Moqam Rural District, Shibkaveh District, Bandar Lengeh County, Hormozgan Province, Iran. At the 2006 census, its population was 125, in 23 families.

References 

Populated places in Bandar Lengeh County